Zalkeh or Zelkeh may refer to:
 Zalkeh, Divandarreh
 Zalkeh, Sarvabad
 Zalakeh (disambiguation)